Radio Invicta may refer to:
Radio Invicta (London), a 1970s/1980s pirate radio station in London
Radio 390 (formerly Invicta), a 1960s offshore radio station

It could also refer to:
Invicta Radio (now Heart Kent), a licensed radio station in Kent